QVD may refer to:

 QVD, Quietly Vesting Disease
 QVD (software), a Linux open source VDI platform
 .QVD (QlikView dashboard default extension), QlikView is a dashboard BI tool